The Kočevski Rog massacre was a series of massacres near Kočevski Rog in late May 1945 in which thousands of members of the Nazi Germany–allied Slovene Home Guard were executed, without formal charges or trial, by special units of the Yugoslav Partisans; other victims were Croat, Serb and Montenegrin collaborationists as well as much smaller numbers of Italian and German troops.

Events

After the armistice, the British repatriated more than 10,000 Slovene collaborators who had attempted to retreat with the Germans; Josip Broz Tito had most of them massacred at the infamous pits of Kočevje. 

The killings continued after the war, as Tito's victorious forces took revenge on their perceived enemies. The British forces in Austria turned back tens of thousands of fleeing Yugoslavs. Estimates range from 30,000 to 55,000 killed between spring and autumn 1945. Most of these prisoners of war who  were repatriated by the British military authorities from Austria, where they had fled, died in these post-war summary executions.

Number of victims
The victims were thrown into various pits and caves, which were then sealed with explosives. There were many thousands of victims, including most of the more than 10,000 POWs according to Encyclopædia Britannica.

Author Nikolai Tolstoy wrote an account of the events in his book The Minister and the Massacres. British author John Corsellis, who served in Austria with the British Army, also wrote of these events in his book Slovenia 1945: Memories of Death and Survival after World War II.

In his 1958 book Kočevje: Tito's Bloodiest Crime, Borivoje Karapandžić, a publicist and World War II propaganda chief for the Serbian fascist, anti-Semitic and Nazi-collaborationist Zbor organization of Dimitrije Ljotić, estimated the total number of victims at about 18,500: 12,000 Slovene Home Guard, 3,000 Serbian volunteer troops, 2,500 Croatian Home Guard and 1,000 Montenegrin chetniks. Karapandžić's evaluation is reported in another newer book printed in Slovene and Italian by a group of scholars.

Notable victims
 France Dejak (1925–2003), thrown into a pit but escaped
 Odon Peterka (1925–1945), poet

References

1945 in Slovenia
Massacres in 1945
Aftermath of World War II in Slovenia
Political and cultural purges
World War II prisoner of war massacres
Massacres in Slovenia
Massacres in Yugoslavia
Yugoslav Partisan war crimes in World War II
May 1945 events in Europe
Mass murder in 1945
Massacres of Croats
Massacres of Serbs